Prince of Brazil (feminine: Princess of Brazil; Portuguese: Príncipe do Brasil; feminine: Princesa do Brasil) was an imperial title of the Empire of Brazil, granted to the sons or daughters of the Emperor and other dynasts of the imperial family who were not the heir apparent or heir presumptive to the throne. It was also used to denote a grandson or granddaughter in the male line of a reigning monarch, with some exceptions.

Style of Address
A Prince or Princess of Brazil was usually entitled to the style of Highness, except for the Prince/ss Imperial and Prince of Grão-Pará, who were addressed as Imperial Highness. Princes or Princesses who bore additional titles of higher standing would be addressed with the style linked with the highest title they possessed. Since the agreement between the French House of Orléans and the Brazilian House of Orléans-Braganza in 1909, Brazilian princes in the line of succession to the former French throne bear the title of Prince of Orléans-Braganza with the style of Royal Highness. Those Princes with higher Brazilian titles may be addressed with the style linked with those titles, in conjunction with their French royal titles and styles; for instance, His Imperial and Royal Highness Prince Luiz of Orléans-Braganza.

Privileges
A Prince or Princess of Brazil would receive financial assistance from birth until death, unless they married a foreign-born spouse or moved out of the country.

Princes of Brazil
Princess Januária Maria (1822-1901)
Princess Paula (1823-1833)
Princess Francisca (1824-1898)
Princess Maria Amélia (1831-1853)
Princess Isabel (1846-1921)
Princess Leopoldina (1847-1871)
Prince Pedro Augusto (1866-1934)
Prince Augusto Leopoldo (1867-1922)
Prince Luís (1878-1920)
Prince Antônio Gastão (1881-1918)

See also
Prince of Brazil, the title used by the heir to the Portuguese throne
Brazilian Empire
Prince Imperial of Brazil
Prince of Grão-Pará
Brazilian nobility

References

Brazilian monarchy
Titles of nobility in the Americas